CAOS, Caos or alternatively styled forms of the word may refer to:

Abbreviations
 Calgary Animated Objects Society, a non-profit charitable arts organization
 CAOs, former abbreviation for Contemporary Art Organisations of Australia, of which ACE Open is a member 
 CAOS Linux, a former RPM-based Linux distribution
 Chilling Adventures of Sabrina (TV series), an American supernatural TV series on Netflix
 Computer-Assisted Organic Synthesis software
 Computer-assisted orthopedic surgery

People
 Gary Caos, Italian DJ and producer
 Silvia Caos (1933–2006), Cuban-born Mexican actress

See also
 Chaos (disambiguation)